Pseudochariesthes nobilis is a species of beetle in the family Cerambycidae. It was described by Karl Jordan in 1894, originally under the genus Chariesthes.

References

Tragocephalini
Beetles described in 1894